The fifth season of The Voice Kids, premiered on TV Globo on January 5, 2020 in the  (BRT / AMT) daytime slot.

On March 18, 2020, TV Globo announced that the live shows which were scheduled to begin on March 29 (following a two-week hiatus due to the 2020 Bahrain Grand Prix scheduled broadcast), would be postponed until later in the year due to the COVID-19 pandemic. Five episodes featuring highlights from the blind auditions and the battles aired during the hiatus.

On August 7, 2020, TV Globo confirmed that the season would return on September 13, 2020, with a special pre-taped episode. The live shows were reduced from five to four and changed to remote shows with pre-recorded performances at the contestants' home.

On September 11, 2020, Claudia Leitte announced that she would not return for the final stage of the competition and her team would be coached by singer Mumuzinho instead, thus making it the first season to have two afro-Brazilian coaches.

On October 11, 2020, Kauê Penna from Team Brown won the competition with 50.50% of the final vote over Maria Eduarda Ribeiro (Team Claudia / Mumuzinho) and Paulo Gomiz (Team Simone & Simaria). This marks Brown's first win as a coach in the Kids series, thus becoming the first coach to win both versions of the show in Brazil.

Teams
 Key

Blind auditions
Key

Episode 1 (Jan. 05)

Episode 2 (Jan. 12)

Episode 3 (Jan. 19)

Episode 4 (Jan. 26)

Episode 5 (Feb. 02)

Episode 6 (Feb. 09)

Episode 7 (Feb. 16)

The Battles
Key

Live shows
After a six-month pause, the live shows were reimagined due to the COVID-19 pandemic in Brazil. The remaining contestants performed at home rather than in the auditorium.

Week 1: Showdown

Week 2: Showdown

Week 3: Semifinals

Week 4: Finals

Elimination chart
Artist's info

	

Result details

Ratings and reception

Brazilian ratings
All numbers are in points and provided by Kantar Ibope Media.

References

External links
Official website on Gshow.com

Kids 5
2020 Brazilian television seasons
Television productions suspended due to the COVID-19 pandemic